Selenaspora is a genus of fungi in the family Sarcosomataceae. The genus is monotypic, containing the single species Selenaspora batava, found in Europe and North America.

References

External links

Fungi of Europe
Fungi of North America
Monotypic Ascomycota genera
Pezizales